A special Tennessee State Route (neologistically a bannered Tennessee State Route) is a special route, or auxiliary routes of the system of state highways in the state of Tennessee.

Like the special U.S. routes, special state routes, as the name suggests, are typically marked with an auxiliary sign (or "banner") above (or occasionally below) the route shield, or a suffix letter after the number in the shield, except for the alternate routes. Alternate auxiliaries of certain secondary routes usually have the letter “A” beside the main route number.

The list below includes the route numbers and locations in which the special routes are located.

Special primary routes

SR 13 
SR 13 Spur – Waverly, Humphreys County

SR 22 
SR 22A – McNairy, Chester, and Henderson Counties.
SR 22 Business – Huntingdon, Carroll County
SR 22 Bypass – Huntingdon, Carroll County

SR 52 
SR 52 Truck – Celina, Clay County

SR 55 
SR 55 Business – McMinnville, Warren County

Special secondary routes

SR 69 
SR 69A – Camden, Benton County north to Paris, Henry County

SR 73
SR 73 Scenic – Townsend, Blount County east to Sevier County (designated officially as SR 337)

SR 82 
SR 82 Bypass – Shelbyville, Bedford County

SR 220 
SR 220A – near Atwood, Carroll County

See also 
List of state routes in Tennessee

References

External links
Tennessee Department of Transportation

Special